is a quarter in Hamburg (Germany) that belongs to the Altona borough. The quarter's boundaries are congruent with the historic center of what has been the city of Altona until 1937.

History 
Altona was founded in 1535 and became a city in 1664. In 1713, it was burned down by Swedish troops. In 1937, it became part of the city of Hamburg.

Geography 
Altona-Altstadt is located between the quarters of Ottensen, Altona-Nord, Sternschanze and St. Pauli. In the south, it borders with the Elbe river.

Politics 
These are the results of Altona-Altstadt in the Hamburg state election:

References 

Quarters of Hamburg
Altona, Hamburg
1535 establishments in the Holy Roman Empire
Populated places established in 1535